John Andrew Durrant Olle (28 December 194712 December 1995), always known as Andrew Olle, was a radio and television presenter

Biography
Ollie was born in Hornsby, New South Wales to John Durrant Ollie he had a long association with the Australian Broadcasting Corporation, beginning his career in 1967 as a news cadet and, until his death, working in a wide variety of programs, including The 7.30 Report, ABC Radio 2BL, Sydney, Nationwide, Four Corners and A Big Country. It was also at 2BL that he met and worked with his long-time friend Paul Lyneham.

Death and legacy
 he  died in 1995 in Sydney from a brain tumour (glioblastoma multiforme) which was not diagnosed until he was rushed to hospital following a massive stroke and collapse. He never regained consciousness and died within a week, on 12 December. He was survived by his wife, Annette, and children Nick Olle, Sam and Nina. On 13 December, in the NSW State Parliament, the Premier of New South Wales Bob Carr, himself a former ABC journalist, moved a formal condolence motion on Olle's death.  For his Memorial Service in the Sydney Town Hall on 22 December, Peter Sculthorpe wrote a special arrangement for cello and piano of his 1947 work Parting, dedicated to Olle, which was played by Nathan Waks and Kathryn Selby.

The Andrew Olle Memorial Trust was established to raise money for brain cancer and neurosurgery research. The Andrew Olle Media Lecture is an annual lecture held by the ABC in his honour.

Sources
 About Andrew Olle, Australian Broadcasting Corporation, 15 October 2003 
 Helen Pitt, A cancer with still no cure in mind, Sydney Morning Herald, 12 December 2005 
 Chris Masters, "Olle, John Andrew (1947–1995)", Australian Dictionary of Biography, 2019

References

1947 births
1995 deaths
Australian television presenters
ABC radio (Australia) journalists and presenters
Deaths from brain tumor